NADH:ubiquinone reductase (non-electrogenic) (NDH-2, ubiquinone reductase, coenzyme Q reductase, dihydronicotinamide adenine dinucleotide-coenzyme Q reductase, DPNH-coenzyme Q reductase, DPNH-ubiquinone reductase, NADH-coenzyme Q oxidoreductase, NADH-coenzyme Q reductase, NADH-CoQ oxidoreductase, NADH-CoQ reductase) is an enzyme with systematic name NADH:ubiquinone oxidoreductase. This enzyme catalyses the following chemical reaction:

NADH + H+ + a quinone  NAD+ + a quinol

The 3 substrates of this enzyme are NADH, H+, and a quinone  (electron acceptor), whereas its two products are NAD+ and a quinol (reduced acceptor).

An important example of this reaction is:

 NADH + H+ + ubiquinone  NAD+ + ubiquinol

This enzyme is a flavoprotein (FAD). It belongs to the family of oxidoreductases, specifically those acting on NADH or NADPH with other acceptors.  The systematic name of this enzyme class is NADH:(quinone-acceptor) oxidoreductase. Other names in common use include reduced nicotinamide adenine dinucleotide (quinone) dehydrogenase, NADH-quinone oxidoreductase, NADH ubiquinone oxidoreductase, DPNH-menadione reductase, D-diaphorase, and NADH2 dehydrogenase (quinone), and mitochondrial (mt) complex I.  This enzyme participates in oxidative phosphorylation.  Several compounds are known to inhibit this enzyme, including AMP, and 2,4-dinitrophenol. NADH dehydrogenase is involved in the first step of the electron transport chain of oxidative phosphorylation (OXPHOS). Any change in the electron transport component caused by a mutation might effect the normal electron flow. This might be leading "an increase of bifurcation and generation of superoxidase radicals and increase oxidative stress in various types of cancer cells."

In the electron transport chain NADH is mainly used to create a concentration gradient of hydrogen in order to make ATP. Since After NADH is oxidized a hydrogen is pumped out and NAD+  will be a product.

Structural studies 
Several structures are available of this enzyme, which is part of the respiratory chain. It is a multi-subunit enzyme in which this activity is located in the hydrophilic domain. The subunits of the membrane-embedded domain are responsible for proton translocation.

References

Further reading

External links 
 

EC 1.6.5